This is a list of rivers of the Americas, it includes major historical or physiological significant rivers of the Americas grouped by region where they are located (Central America, Northern America, West Indies and South Americas).  The longest rivers in each country are included.  Further details and references are provided in each river's separate article. Unusually significant tributaries appear in this list, under the river into which they drain.

The longest river in the Americas is the Amazon River.
The length measurements of many rivers are only approximations and differ from each other because there are many factors that determine the calculated river length, such as the position of the geographical source and the mouth, the scale of measurement, and the length measuring techniques (for details see also List of rivers by length).

There are 11 countries in the Americas that do not have rivers: Anguilla, Aruba, Bermuda, Bonaire, Cayman Islands, Curaçao, Saba, Saint Barthélemy, Saint Martin, Sint Eustatius, and Sint Maarten.

North America

Central America

The water in rivers in Central America flows to either the Atlantic Ocean or Pacific Ocean. The Río Coco, locally known as the Wanks, runs along the border with Honduras and is the longest river flowing totally within Central America. The second longest river in Central America is the Patuca River.

Some of the significant rivers and their lengths in Central America include:

Northern America

Water from rivers in the Northern Americas flows toward either the Arctic Ocean, Atlantic Ocean, Pacific Ocean, the land-locked Great Basin in the western United States or the interior basin in Mexico.

The Missouri River is the longest river in North America and the United States.  The second longest river in North America and the United States is the Mississippi River.  The Rio Conchos is the longest river in Mexico.  The longest river in Canada is the Mackenzie River.

Some of the longest or otherwise notable rivers include the rivers listed in the table below.

West Indies

The significant rivers in the West Indies include the following:

South America

The following are some of the significant rivers in South America
Aconcagua - Chile
Amazon - Ecuador, Perú, Bolivia, Venezuela, Colombia, Brazil (flows into the Atlantic Ocean) 
Solimões - name given in Brazil to the portions of the Amazon upstream of its confluence with the Rio Negro
Ucayali - Peru
Tambo - Peru
Ene - Peru
Mantaro - Peru
Apurímac - Peru
Urubamba - Peru
Marañón - Peru
Pastaza - Ecuador, Peru
Huallaga - Peru
Putumayo - Colombia, Peru, Brazil
Juruá - Peru, Brazil
Caquetá - Colombia, Brazil
Purus - Peru, Brazil
Rio Negro - Venezuela, Colombia, Brazil
Casiquiare Canal - a large natural canal in Venezuela connecting the Rio Negro with the upper Orinoco River
Vaupés - Colombia, Brazil
 Rio Branco - Brazil
Madeira - Bolivia, Brazil
Beni - Bolivia
Madre de Dios - Peru, Bolivia
Mamoré - Bolivia, Brazil
Guaporé - Brazil, Bolivia
Tapajós - Brazil
Xingu - Brazil
Tocantins - Brazil
Araguaia - Brazil
Apure - Venezuela
Atrato - Colombia
Baudó - Colombia
Bío-Bío - Chile
Malleco - Chile
Caroní - Venezuela
Catatumbo - Colombia, Venezuela
Zulia - Venezuela, Colombia
Sardinata - Colombia
Cauca - Colombia
Cautín - Chile
Chubut - Argentina
Colorado - Argentina
Elqui - Chile
Essequibo - Guyana
Itata - Chile
Ñuble - Chile
Loa - Chile
Magdalena - Colombia
Maipo - Chile
Mapocho - Chile
Maule - Chile
Loncomilla - Chile
Achibueno - Chile
Ancoa - Chile
Longaví - Chile
Perquilauquén - Chile
Purapel - Chile
Putagán - Chile
Melado - Chile
Maullín - Chile
Maroni - Suriname, French Guiana
Mira - Colombia
Orinoco - Colombia, Venezuela
Apure - Venezuela
Arauca - Colombia, Venezuela
Meta - Colombia, Venezuela
Guaviare - Colombia
Meta - Colombia
Tomo - Colombia
Vichada - Colombia
Parnaiba - Brazil
Rapel - Chile
Reñihue - Chile
Río Bueno - Chile
Rahue - Chile
Damas - Chile
Río de la Plata It is not really a river but the lower stretch of the Paraná and the estuary that forms after its confluence with the Uruguay
Paraná - Brazil, Argentina, Paraguay
Uruguay - Brazil, Argentina, Uruguay
Palena - Chile
Patía - Colombia
Petrohué - Chile
Puelo - Chile
São Francisco - Brazil
San Jorge - Colombia
San Juan - Colombia
Sinú - Colombia
Toltén - Chile
Trancura - Chile
Valdivia - Chile
Calle-Calle - Chile
San Pedro - Chile
Enco - Chile
Llanquihue - Chile
Huahum - Chile, Argentina
Chapelco - Argentina
Liquiñe - Chile 
Cau-Cau - Chile
Cruces - Chile
Cutipay - Chile
Futa - Chile
Yelcho - Chile
Futaleufú - Chile

Related articles and lists
List of Hudson Bay rivers
List of rivers of Central America and the Caribbean
List of rivers of the Americas by coastline
List of rivers of the Great Basin

See also
List of rivers of the Americas by coastline
List of reference tables (lists other than rivers)
List of rivers by length
List of rivers of Africa
List of rivers of Antarctica
List of rivers of Asia
List of rivers of Europe
List of rivers of Oceania
List of waterways
Lists of rivers
Paleo-Bell River (Ancient river)

References

General references
, GEOnet Names Server

Americas
Rivers
Rivers
Rivers